Choanephora cucurbitarum is a fungal plant pathogen that causes fruit and blossom rot of various cucurbits.  It can also affect okra, snap bean, and southern pea, and may cause a stem and leaf rot of Withania somnifera. Recently Das et al. 2017 added few more patho-index on aubergine (Solanum melongena L.), teasle gourd (Momordica subangulata Blume subsp. renigera (G. Don) de Wilde, hyacinth bean (Lablab purpureus (L.) Sweet), green pea (Pisum sativum) from India. Wet weather, high temperature and high humidity favor disease development from inoculum that is typically soil-borne. Signs of infection on fruits or leaves include water-soaked, necrotic lesions, which progress rapidly under ideal conditions. As the fungus begins to produce spores, affected tissues become dark grey-brown and hairy as a result of the superficial sporangia.

Description
Sporangiophores bearing sporangiola are erect, hyaline, unbranched, and apically dilated to form a clavate vesicle, from which arise dichotomously branched, distally clavate secondary vesicles. The sporangioles are indehiscent, ellipsoid, brown to dark brown with distinct longitudinal striations and measure 12-20μm x 6-12μm. Sporangia are multispored, spherical, initially white to yellow, pale brown to dark brown at maturity and measure 40-160μm. Sporangiospores from sporangia are ellipsoid to broadly ellipsoid, brown to dark brown, indistinctly striate with fine hyaline polar appendages, and measure 16-20 µm x 8-12 µm (Saroj et al. 2012).

References

 P. M. Kirk. Mycol. Pap. 152:1, 1984.
 A. Saroj, A. Kumar, N. Qamar, M. Alam, H.N. Singh and A. Khaliq. 2012. First report of wet rot of Withania somnifera caused by Choanephora cucurbitarum in India. Plant Disease 96(2): 293.2. 
 S. Das, S.Dutta, B.Mondal. 2017 First report of Choanephora cucurbitarum, causing leaf blight of hyacinthbean [Lablab purpureus (L.) Sweet], in India. Journal of Plant Pathology 99 (2), 533-543 
 S. Das, S.Dutta, A. Chattopadhyay, and B.Mondal. 2017 First report of Choanephora infundibulifera causing blossom blight of teasle gourd in India. Indian Phytopathology 70(2):265-267 
 S. Das, S.Dutta and B.Mondal. 2017 First report on blossom and leaf blight of aubergine (Solanum melongena L.) caused by Choanephora infundibulifera (Currey) Sacc., in India. Journal of Mycology and Plant Pathology Vol 47(1):69-73.
 S. Das, S.Dutta, S.P. Kuiry, and B.Mondal. 2017 First report of twig blight disease of green pea (Pisum sativum) caused by Choanephora infundibulifera in India. Indian Phytopathology Vol 70(3):400-402

External links
 APS: Choanephora fruit rot on squash. APS publication number IW00007.

Fungal plant pathogens and diseases
Eudicot diseases
Zygomycota
Fungi described in 1875